The Man Who Sold His Skin is a 2020 internationally co-produced drama film directed by Kaouther Ben Hania. Its plot was inspired by Belgian contemporary artist Wim Delvoye's living work Tim (2006), which was in turn inspired by Roald Dahl's 1952 short story "Skin". It was selected as the Tunisian entry for the Best International Feature Film at the 93rd Academy Awards, making the shortlist of fifteen films. In March 2021, it was nominated for the Best International Feature Film.

It premiered in the Horizons section at the 77th Venice International Film Festival, where Yahya Mahayni won the Best Actor Award.

Plot
Raqqa fiancés Sam and Abeer are separated by the Syrian Civil War. While he seeks refuge in Lebanon, her family forces her to marry a richer man and move with him to Brussels. In the desperate pursuit of money and the needed paperwork to travel to Europe to rescue her, Sam accepts to have his back tattooed as a Schengen visa by one of the most controversial contemporary artists in the West. His own body turned into a living work of art and promptly exhibited in a museum, Sam will soon realize he has sold away more than just his skin.

Cast
 Yahya Mahayni as Sam Ali
 Dea Liane as Abeer
 Koen De Bouw as Jeffrey Godefroi
 Monica Bellucci as Soraya Waldy
 Saad Lostan as Ziad
 Darina Al Joundi as Sam's mother
 Jan Dahdouh as Hazem
 Christian Vadim as William
 Wim Delvoye as insurance broker

Accolades

See also
 List of submissions to the 93rd Academy Awards for Best International Feature Film
 List of Tunisian submissions for the Academy Award for Best International Feature Film

References

External links
 
 

2020 films
2020 drama films
2020s Arabic-language films
2020s English-language films
2020s French-language films
Tunisian drama films
French drama films
German drama films
Belgian drama films
Cypriot drama films
Swedish drama films
Turkish drama films
Films set in 2011
Films set in Beirut
Films set in Brussels
Films set in Syria
Films set in museums
Films about tattooing
Films about the visual arts
Films about illegal immigration to Europe
2020 multilingual films
Tunisian multilingual films
French multilingual films
German multilingual films
Belgian multilingual films
Swedish multilingual films
Turkish multilingual films
2020s French films